Dharche Rural Municipality (Nepali :धार्चे गाँउपालिका) is a Gaunpalika in Gorkha District in Gandaki Province of Nepal. It is divided into 7 wards. On 12 March 2017, the government of Nepal implemented a new local administrative structure, with the implementation of the new local administrative structure, VDCs have been replaced with municipal and Village Councils. Dharche is one of these 753 local units.

Demographics
At the time of the 2011 Nepal census, Dharche Rural Municipality had a population of 13,264. Of these, 85.4% spoke Gurung, 7.6% Nepali, 4.6% Ghale, 2.1% Tamang, 0.2% Rai and 0.1% other languages as their first language.

In terms of ethnicity/caste, 82.8% were Gurung, 11.3% Ghale, 5.0% Kami, 0.3% Hill Brahmin, 0.2% Chhetri, 0.2% Rai and 0.2% others.

In terms of religion, 56.2% were Buddhist, 25.3% Hindu, 12.8% Bon, 5.6% Christian and 0.1% others.

In terms of literacy, 46.5% could both read and write, 4.7% could read but not write and 48.8% could neither read nor write.

References 

Gorkha District
Gandaki Province
Rural municipalities of Nepal established in 2017
Rural municipalities in Gorkha District